Margaret Taylor Hance (July 2, 1923 – April 29, 1990) was the first female mayor of Phoenix, Arizona, taking office in 1976. She proved popular, winning four consecutive two-year terms, from 1976 to 1984.

Biography
Hance (born Margaret Taylor) was born in Spirit Lake, Iowa, to Glen C. and Helen Kenny Taylor, the youngest of three children. She grew up active in athletics. She was a Girl Scout in Phoenix, AZ.

She earned a bachelor's degree from Scripps College in Claremont, California, in 1945.  Hance, then Taylor, married Richard M. Hance in 1945, and the couple had three children.

Mrs. Hance was the president of the Junior League of Phoenix, a volunteer organization for women who want to improve the community, from 1959–1960.

In 1967, Hance began producing documentaries for a local PBS affiliate.  She decided to get involved in local politics after her husband died in 1970.  Among her first significant public initiatives was creating the Phoenix Mountain Preserve, for which she was unofficially known as the "Mother of Mountain Preserve."

After retiring as mayor, Hance worked with the Reagan and Bush (I) administrations.

Hance died of cancer on April 29, 1990.

Awards and honors
 Woman of the Year, 1978, Advertising Club
 Centennial Award, Salvation Army
 President, National Conference of Republican Mayors and Elected Officials, 1982
 The Margaret T. Hance Park that is on top of the Deck Park Tunnel in Phoenix is named after Hance.

Notes

References
 Obituary, New York Times, May 1, 1990

1923 births
1990 deaths
Women mayors of places in Arizona
Arizona Republicans
Deaths from cancer in Arizona
Mayors of Phoenix, Arizona
People from Spirit Lake, Iowa
Scripps College alumni
Members of the Junior League